The 1956–57 NBA season was the Royals ninth season in the NBA.

It was also the franchise's final season in Rochester.  The team relocated to Cincinnati during the offseason.

Preseason

Draft picks

Regular season

Season standings

x – clinched playoff spot

Record vs. opponents

Game log

Player statistics

Awards and records
 Maurice Stokes, All-NBA Second Team

References

Sacramento Kings seasons
Rochester
Rochester Royals
Rochester Royals